Jez may refer to:

People 
 Jez (nickname), most commonly shorthand for the given names Jeremy, Jeremiah, Jerahmeel (roughly homophonous to "Jers" in non-rhotic accents); Jezabel and Jezreel.

Surname 
 František Jež (born 1970), Czech ski jumper
 Ignacy Jeż (1914–2007), Polish Catholic bishop
 Jerzy Jeż (born 1954), Polish slalom canoeist
 Michael Jez (born 1954), Australian rules footballer
 Róbert Jež (born 1981), Slovak footballer

Other uses 
 Jeż coat of arms